Hendre is one of eight electoral wards in the city of Bangor, Gwynedd, Wales. The ward covers part of the city south of the city centre, including West End and Glan Adda. It elects two councillors to Bangor City Council and one county councillor to Gwynedd Council.

The ward population, according to the 2011 Census, was 1,496.

County council ward
Hendre has been an electoral ward to Gwynedd Council since 1995, electing one county councillor. The 1995, 1999 and 2004 elections were won by the Labour Party. Plaid Cymru's John Wynn Jones won in 2008 and 2012.

In the May 2017 county council election the result was a dead heat between the Plaid Cymru candidate, John Wynn Jones and Independent candidate, Richard Hughes. Each candidate had received 132 votes. The returning officer 'drew lots' by pulling a name from a pot, resulting in Hughes winning the seat.

* = sitting councillor prior to the election

A 2018 report by the Boundary Commission for Wales, if agreed, would merge Hendre with neighbouring areas to form a new two-member ward. Low voter registration of the university students was blamed for the small electorates in the city.

See also
 List of electoral wards in Gwynedd

References

Bangor, Gwynedd
Gwynedd electoral wards